Simon Meister (20 December 1796 – 29 February 1844) was a German painter.

Life 
Meister was born in Koblenz in 1796 as the son of a saddler. He possibly learned his father's trade and received his first private drawing lessons in his home town before going to Paris. There he studied painting with Horace Vernet. After a scholarship from Frederick William III of Prussia expired, Meister returned to Koblenz in 1828, where he married.

During these years he mainly painted portraits of Koblenz citizens. Meister's attempts to obtain commissions from the Prussian king were only partially successful, despite support from Alexander von Humboldt, and his efforts to obtain a position at an academy failed.

Around 1833, he moved with his family to Cologne, where he died in 1844 at the age of 47. Contemporaries suggested that he had a drinking problem in the last years of his life. In the obituary for him, "abdominal inflammation" is given as the cause of death.

Meister's subjects were portraits, battle scenes and animal fights. Religious themes apparently played no significant role in his work, but his depictions of the Cologne Carnival are significant in terms of cultural history. A commercial enterprise was the panoramas painted together with his brother showing the passage of French troops across the Rhine in 1797, which was accessible in Cologne for an entrance fee. It was supposedly later taken to Paris, but this did not happen due to Meister's death. Many of Meister's paintings were also reproduced as lithographs. He is considered one of the most important Rhenish painters of the Biedermeier period.

His gravesite is at the Melaten Cemetery in Cologne. (Lit. J, zwischen Lit.A+B).

Family 
Simon Meister's half-brother  and his son Ernst Meister were also painters.

Work (selection) 

 Equestrian portrait from Napoleon Bonaparte, 1826.
 Self-portrait from 1827 in the Wallraf-Richartz-Museum & Fondation Corboud
 Death of Adolf von Nassau at the Battle of Göllheim, 1829
 Die Familie Tillmann, 1832.
 Napoleon zu Pferde, 1832, 
  Self-portrait with his brother Nikolaus, (1833–1834)
 , 1836
 Portrait of the perfume manufacturer Johann Baptist Farina, 1837
 Portrit of the composer Ludwig Spohr
 Der Rheinübergang der Franzosen bei Neuwied (1797) aus dem Jahr 1841 (with Nikolas Meister)
 The Battle of Kulm
 Die Ansicht der Schloss Stolzenfels bei Sonnenuntergang
 Das Reiterbildniß des Kronprinzen von Preußen, wie er 1834 in Begleitung zweier Generäle von einer in der Nähe von Köln abgehaltenen Parade zurückkehrt
 Löwenkampf.
 Portrait of the architect

History of impact 
From Franz Kellerhoven comes a lithograph after the self-portrait of the painter Simon Meister.

Meister's pupils included .

The writer  adapted Meister's life story in the novel Simon im Glück, published in 1949.

References

Further reading 
 Stéphanie Baumewerd: Meister, Simon. In Bénédicte Savoy, France Nerlich (ed.): Pariser Lehrjahre. Ein Lexikon zur Ausbildung deutscher Maler in der französischen Hauptstadt. Vol 1: 1793–1843. Berlin/Boston 2013, {.
 Das von den Gebrüdern Simon und Niklas Meister gemalte Rundgemälde des schönsten Punktes des Mittelrheins, von Ehrenbreitstein bis Hammerstein: belebt durch den vierten Rheinübergang der Franzosen unter General Hoche 1797, topographisch-historisch erklärt; mit einer übersichtlichen historischen Einleitung und Umrissen zu einer Biographie des General Hoche. Bachem, Cologne 1841 
 
 Klaus Weschenfelder (ed.): Simon Meister 1796–1844. Exhibition catalogue and catalogue raisonné, Koblenz 1994.
 Otto Brües: Simon im Glück. Gütersloh 1949 (A novel depicting Meister's life story, not a scientific study).

External links 

 

 

19th-century German painters
19th-century German male artists
1796 births
1844 deaths
Artists from Koblenz